Radovići is a village in the municipality of Tivat, Montenegro. It is located on the Luštica.

Demographics
According to the 2011 census, it had a population of 515 people.

References

Serb communities in Montenegro
Populated places in Tivat Municipality